Robert Delapierre (1891-1970) was a Belgian philatelist who signed the Roll of Distinguished Philatelists in 1970.

References

Belgian philatelists
Signatories to the Roll of Distinguished Philatelists
1891 births
1970 deaths